Renato Baldini (18 December 1921 – 5 July 1995) was an Italian film actor. He appeared in 87 films between 1950 and 1983. He was born in Rome, Italy.

Selected filmography

 It's Forever Springtime (1950) - Un carabiniere al processo
 Il Mulatto (1950) - Matteo Belfiore
 Il richiamo nella tempesta (1950)
 Behind Closed Shutters (1951) - Primavera
 Four Ways Out (1951) - Paolo Leandri
 Red Moon (1951) - Paolo Cassino
 Carcerato (1951) - Giacomo Marini
 Rosalba, la fanciulla di Pompei (1952) - Vittorio Stelio
 Non ho paura di vivere (1952)
 Nessuno ha tradito (1952)
 The Legend of the Piave (1952) - Don Carlo, capellano
 Drama on the Tiber (1952) - Bruno Rossi
 Delitto al luna park (1952) - Roberto
 Sins of Rome (1953) - Gladiator (uncredited)
 The Wayward Wife (1953) - Luciano Vittoni - L'amante di Gemma
 Carcerato (1953) - Renato
 Theodora, Slave Empress (1954) - Arcas
 Naples Is Always Naples (1954) - Pietro Cafiero
 Orphan of the Ghetto (1954)
 Foglio di via (1954) - Carlo
 Submarine Attack (1955) - Submarine Commandanti
 Nagana (1955) - Maurice Leblond
 La catena dell'odio (1955) - Ing. Mauro Ferri
 Ángeles sin cielo (1957) - Dr. Luis Losada
 Dinanzi a noi il cielo (1957)
 Girls of the Night (1958) - Marco
 Gagliardi e pupe (1958) - Gigi
 Herod the Great (1958) - Claudio
 Head of a Tyrant (1959) - Arbar
 The White Warrior (1959) - Ahmed Khan
 La Garçonnière (1960) - Father
 Esther and the King (1960) - Klydrathes
 La donna di ghiaccio (1960) - Franco Mauri / Franco De Angelis
 Girl with a Suitcase (1961) - Francia
 Gli scontenti (1961) - Il brigadiere
 Armas contra la ley (1961)
 The Slave (1962) - Verulus - Caesar's adjutant
 The Golden Arrow (1962) - Prince of Bassora
 The Black Invaders (1962) - Dominique De Gourges
 The Secret Seven (1963) - Kadem
 Nine Miles to Noon (1963) - Dio Dimou
 The Thief of Damascus (1964) - Uria
 Devil of the Desert Against the Son of Hercules (1964) - Kamal, the Wealthy Sheik
 The Shoot (1964) - Barud
 Giants of Rome (1964) - Drood
 Last of the Renegades (1964) - Col. J.F. Merril
 Among Vultures (1964) - Judge George Leader
 Squillo (1964)
 Revenge of The Gladiators (1964) - General Ezio
 Berlin, Appointment for the Spies (1965) - Mohamed Belkheir
 Man from Canyon City (1965) - Grieves
 The Desperado Trail (1965) - (uncredited)
 Agent X-77 Orders to Kill (1966) - Dr. Lupescu
 4 Dollars of Revenge (1966)
 That Man George (1966)
 Sharp-Shooting Twin Sisters (1966) - Farrell
 Snow Devils (1967) - Lt. Jim Harris
 Clint the Stranger (1967) - Calloway - Farmer
 Joe l'implacabile (1967) - Jury Nelson
 Avenger X (1967) - Antonio 'Joe' Caruso
 OSS 117 – Double Agent (1968) - MacLeod - un diplomatico della CIA
 Ciccio perdona... Io no! (1968)
 Carogne si nasce (1968) - Mayor Johnson
 Ms. Stiletto (1969) - Gunther
 Sartana the Gravedigger (1969) - The Judge
 Death Knocks Twice (1969) - Mr. Simmons
 Gli infermieri della mutua (1969) - Ing. Moscati
 Paths of War (1970) - Jeff
 Ma chi t'ha dato la patente? (1970)
 Light the Fuse... Sartana Is Coming (1970) - Nobody (uncredited)
 Principe coronato cercasi per ricca ereditiera (1970) - General Scannapieco
 Armiamoci e partite! (1971)  - Giovanni
 My Name Is Mallory... M Means Death (1971) - Col. Todd Hasper
 In the Name of the Italian People (1971) - Ragionier Cerioni
 Who Killed the Prosecutor and Why? (1972) - Marshal Notarantonio
 Return of Halleluja (1972) - Gen. Miranda
 Storia di fifa e di coltello - Er seguito d'er più (1972) - Old Man of Borgo
 I pugni di Rocco (1972) - Pietro Colantini
 Rugantino (1973) - Nobile
 Metti lo diavolo tuo ne lo mio inferno (1973) - Beppe Pirletti
 Pasqualino Cammarata, Frigate Captain (1974)
 Di Tresette ce n'è uno, tutti gli altri son nessuno (1974) - Banker
 Manone il ladrone (1974) - Commissario
 Smiling Maniacs (1975) - Man setting fire
 Loaded Guns (1975) - Ali
 Legend of the Sea Wolf (1975)
 Kidnap Syndicate (1975) - Antonio Polieviti
 A Genius, Two Partners and a Dupe (1975) - Sheriff in saloon
 Sapore di mare 2 - Un anno dopo (1983)

References

External links

1921 births
1995 deaths
Male actors from Rome
Italian male film actors
20th-century Italian male actors